Bosch is a hamlet in the Dutch province of North Brabant. It is located in the municipality of Cranendonck, about 1.5 km east of Budel.

It was first mentioned in 1307 as Henricus de Silua, and means "forest". According to the 19th-century historian A.J. van der Aa, Bosch consisted of 23 houses and had a population of 150 to 160 people in the middle of the 19th century. It was built on a dyke in heath lands. Bosch has no place name signs, and consists of about 100 houses.

References

Populated places in North Brabant
Cranendonck